The UTAS XTR-12 is a semi automatic shotgun manufactured by UTAS Defence of Turkey.

Overview
The XTR-12 is a gas operated semi-automatic shotgun derived from the AR-10 platform.

References

Semi-automatic shotguns of Turkey